United Nations Security Council resolution 707, adopted unanimously on 15 August 1991, after recalling Resolution 687 (1991) and hearing representations from the International Atomic Energy Agency (IAEA) and United Nations Special Commission, the council, acting under Chapter VII, condemned Iraq for violations and non-compliance of Resolution 687 (1991) and extended powers to the Special Commission and IAEA.

In this regard, the council made several demands to the Government of Iraq, demanding that it:

(b) allow the IAEA and Special Commission unrestricted access to areas they wish to inspect, including to those they were denied access;
(c) cease attempts to conceal, remove or destroy its nuclear, chemical or biological weapons or ballistic missile programmes;
(d) allow the Special Commission and IAEA to conduct surveillance and inspection flights across the country, also for the purposes of aerial surveying;
(e) halt nuclear activities of any kind, excluding those for agricultural, industrial or medical purposes;
(f) guarantee the safety and immunity of all Special Commission and IAEA representatives, providing transport for them when necessary;
(g) respond to all questions or requests from the IAEA and Special Commission.

Resolution 707 stated that Iraq must comply with the above provisions without delay, and with those in the Nuclear Non-Proliferation Treaty with which it was currently violating.

See also
 Foreign relations of Iraq
 Gulf War
 Iraq and weapons of mass destruction
 Iraq disarmament timeline 1990–2003
 Sanctions against Iraq
 List of United Nations Security Council Resolutions 701 to 800 (1991–1993)
 United Nations Security Council Resolution 715

References

External links
 
Text of the Resolution at undocs.org

 0707
 0707
1991 in Iraq
Iraq and weapons of mass destruction
 0707
August 1991 events